Bayken Ashimov (10 August 1917 – 5 February 2010) was a Kazakh politician. He served as Chairmen of the Council of People's Commissars from March 1970 to March 1984. He also served as Chairmen of the Presidium of the Supreme Soviet from March 1984 to 1985.

Death
Ashimov died on 5 February 2010 at the age of 92, probably due to illness.

References

External links
Kazakhstani Statesman

1917 births
2010 deaths
Communist Party of Kazakhstan politicians
Eighth convocation members of the Soviet of the Union
Ninth convocation members of the Soviet of the Union
Tenth convocation members of the Soviet of the Union
Eleventh convocation members of the Soviet of the Union
Heroes of Socialist Labour
Recipients of the Order of Lenin
Recipients of the Order of Parasat
Recipients of the Order of the Red Banner of Labour
Recipients of the Order of the Red Star
Recipients of the Silver Cross of the Virtuti Militari
Place of birth missing
Heads of government of the Kazakh Soviet Socialist Republic